FusionCharts, part of InfoSoft Global (P) Ltd, is a privately held software provider of data visualization products (JavaScript Charts, Maps, Widgets and Dashboards) with offices in Bangalore and Kolkata, India. FusionCharts has 23,000 customers and 500,000 users in 120 countries, including technology giants such as Apple, Google, ZOHO, Cisco, Facebook, Intel, LinkedIn, Microsoft, Hewlett-Packard, IBM, EMC, Nokia, Tibco, as well as The Weather Channel, NASA, and the Federal Government of the United States.

A 100% bootstrapped company, FusionCharts has earned $4.5 million in revenue in 2010-11. and has clocked revenues of up to $7 million, or Rs 39 crore.

History

The idea behind FusionCharts was born in 2001 when 16-year-old Pallav Nadhani found himself dissatisfied with Microsoft Excel's charting capabilities while using the program to complete high school class assignments. Nadhani subsequently authored an article on Wrox Press's ASPToday.com technology website which examined the thesis that Macromedia Flash, then used mainly for web banners and pop-up ad, could be used to build an interactive charting solution for business applications such as dashboards and reports. The article earned him $1,500 and feedback from developers, which together acted as seed money and motivation for establishing the FusionCharts concept.

In 2002 at 17, Nadhani founded Infosoft Global. The initial product had six charts and was built using ActionScript. Nadhani worked alone developing the product, website, documents, sales and marketing and customer support for the first three years. As the company began to take off in 2005, he acquired office space in Bangur and hired 20 employees over the following 2–3 years. The venture grew during this period without raising external funding by bootstrapping.

By 2009, the company had moved to Salt Lake City, Kolkata, and had grown to over 50 employees. Since arriving in Salt Lake, the staff has expanded by 250 percent of its original size, and in 2011 FusionCharts opened their second office in Bangalore.

FusionCharts' client list, with customers across 118 countries and numerous business sectors, has drawn significant attention. The company was placed squarely on the global platform following its 2010 selection by US President Barack Obama to design the digital dashboards for the federal administration, the Federal IT Dashboard. FusionCharts was the first Indian startup to gain the attention of the Obama administration.

Co-founder Pallav Nadhani is the CEO of FusionCharts and also runs a seed funding venture capital fund named Seeders Inc.

In March 2020, the company was acquired by Idera, Inc., a U.S.-based software company.

Marketing
Since its founding in 2003, FusionCharts has put together an almost completely online network of international resellers serving places like Korea, Brazil, China and the United States.

The company has also made use of search engine optimization and pay per click marketing, and engages users and developers by composing articles, whitepapers, and case studies on the subject of data visualization in various online publications.

FusionCharts also engages in advertising in both online and print developer magazines in key markets such as the US, Europe and Korea. The company is increasing its social media marketing and is emphasizing push–pull marketing strategy.

Another aspect of marketing is a simple licensing framework as well as a FOSS version of its FusionCharts product that serves over 100,000 users.

FusionCharts is typically targeted to developers who wish to integrate interactive charts in their reports, dashboards, analytics, monitors, and surveys.

Products
Pallav Nadhani's original ASPToday.com article called for creating a charting library using Flash, combined with ASP to power it with data. Developers responded positively and shared ideas on how to increase its power and functionality. Subsequently, Pallav coded this idea into a charting application, which led to the birth of the FusionCharts software.

FusionCharts has since transitioned to use JavaScript, SVG and VML to render charts, widgets and maps. This allows its components to be used on all mobile devices and cross-platform browsers. It does allow for optional rendering using Flash. FusionCharts Suite XT can today be used with any web scripting language to deliver interactive and powerful charts. Using XML and JSON as its data interfaces, FusionCharts Suite XT makes full use of HTML 5 technologies to create compact, interactive, and visually-arresting charts.

FusionCharts Suite XT

Book
British book publisher Packt UK has released a guidebook aimed at helping new users learn the basics of the FusionCharts Suite XT.

Achievements
In 2009, the company was included in the NASSCOM EMERGE 50 Leaders for 2009 due to its success in establishing its data visualization software globally. In the same year it was also awarded the Deloitte Technology Fast50 India award in 2009.

FusionCharts was in 2010 named as one of the 15 companies likely to become the next Infosys.

The chart-gadget within Google Docs is powered by FusionCharts. Internally, Google employees also employ FusionCharts software for reporting. FusionCharts says that it powers over one billion charts every month globally.

See also 

 JavaScript framework
 JavaScript library

References

Charts
Indian companies established in 2003
Software companies of India
Information technology companies of Bangalore
Companies based in Kolkata
Data visualization software
International information technology consulting firms
Information technology consulting firms of India
Infographics
2003 establishments in Karnataka
Software companies established in 2003